Harold Murray McClure (August 8, 1859 – March 1, 1919), nicknamed "Mac", was a former professional baseball player who played outfield in the Major Leagues for the 1882 Boston Red Caps.

External links

1859 births
1919 deaths
Major League Baseball outfielders
Baseball players from Pennsylvania
19th-century baseball players
Boston Red Caps players
Philadelphia Athletic players
Philadelphia (minor league baseball) players
Binghamton Crickets (1870s) players
Syracuse Stars (minor league baseball) players
Capital City of Albany players
Rochester Hop Bitters players